The 1957 Mississippi State Maroons football team represented Mississippi State College during the 1957 NCAA University Division football season. The Maroons finished the season ranked in the AP Poll for the first time since 1942 and would not finish another season ranked until 1974. Head coach Wade Walker was named SEC Coach of the Year.

Schedule

References

Mississippi State
Mississippi State Bulldogs football seasons
Mississippi State Maroons football